Our Confederate Soldiers is a Confederate monument in Beaumont, Texas, United States. The memorial was removed and put into storage on June 29th 2020 in the wake of the George Floyd protests.

History
The statue was created in 1912, and placed in Keith Park. In 1926, it was moved to Wiess Park, a few miles away. The statue had to be repaired in 1986 after a storm knocked it over, and was put back on the pedestal.

See also
 List of monuments and memorials removed during the George Floyd protests

References

Monuments and memorials in the United States removed during the George Floyd protests
Buildings and structures in Beaumont, Texas
Confederate States of America monuments and memorials in Texas
Outdoor sculptures in Texas
Sculptures of men in Texas
Statues in Texas
Relocated buildings and structures in Texas
Statues removed in 2020